Smithsonian Research Online is a database of bibliographic citations and full texts of publications by Smithsonian Institution scholars. It is managed by the Smithsonian Institution Libraries. Access to the database is free.

The database contained some 10,000 citations as of 2011. An increasing proportion of the citations includes full texts.  

Purposes of the database include facilitating discovery of Smithsonian research publications  and "assisting in measuring and communicating the magnitude, value, and impact of Smithsonian research."

References

External links
 

Smithsonian Institution
Full-text scholarly online databases
Research projects
Bibliographic databases and indexes
Scholarly search services